Dahachok is a village and former Village Development Committee that is now part of Chandragiri Municipality in Kathmandu District in Province No. 3 of central Nepal. At the time of the 2011 Nepal census it had a population of 4,036. It is located in the west of Kathmandu.''

Kalu Pande memorial
The burial ground on hill top of Kaji Kalu Pande is a popular hiking spot. It lies in Chandragiri, western outskirts of Kathmandu from where Gorkha can be seen.

Gallery

References

Populated places in Kathmandu District